Sista may refer to:

"Sister", spelled in eye dialect 
Sista River, a river in Russia's Leningrad Oblast which drains into Koporye Bay
Sista Monica Parker (1956–2014), an American musician
La Sista, a Puerto Rican reggaeton artist
Sista Otis, an American musician
Sista, a 1994 album by Swing Mob
"Sista", a song by the John Butler Trio from their 2003 live album Living 2001–2002
Sista, an American R&B female quartet who recorded the 1994 album 4 All the Sistas Around da World

See also
"Sista Sista", a 1998 song by Beverley Knight
Sister Souljah (born 1964), an American activist
Systa, a 1994 album by American hip hop duo Terri & Monica